Generation Yes was an astroturf group in Ireland that was active in promoting the country's European Union (EU) membership and a 'Yes' vote in the campaign prior to the second referendum on the country's ratification of the Treaty of Lisbon, which was held on 2 October 2009.

The group was launched 24 April 2009, was primarily made up of college students and graduates. Generation Yes had a stated aim to use social networking websites (such as Facebook and Twitter) to organise a "grassroots movement".

Despite is claims to promote Ireland in Europe the fact that it didn't do anything after the second lisbon treaty referendum, and that the website was not renewed indicates it was just a referendum campaign channel and not an organic pro-eu advocacy group.

References

External links
 GenerationYes.ie - Official website
 Interview with Generation Yes director Andrew Byrne - Radio France Internationale
 - Generation Yes Director Andrew Byrne debates on a BBC panel
 

Youth organisations based in the Republic of Ireland
Organizations established in 2009
Treaty of Lisbon
Political advocacy groups in the Republic of Ireland